Dole-Ville station is a railway station located in Dole, Jura, France. The train services are operated by SNCF.

Services
The following services stop at Dole-Ville:

 TER Bourgogne-Franche-Comté:

References

External links 
 
 

Railway stations in France opened in 1855
Railway stations in Jura (department)